The Matzen oil field is an oil field located in Vienna Basin. It was discovered in 1949 and developed by OMV. It began production in 1949 and produces oil.

References

External links

 Godfrid WESSELY Oil and Gas Occurrences of the Vienna Basin
 Wolfgang Nachtmann (2007) Exploration Country Focus: Austria

Natural gas fields in Austria
Oil fields of Austria
1949 establishments in Austria